Chirayinkeezhu railway station (Code:CRY) is a NSG 5 D category railway station in Thiruvananthapuram District, Kerala, and falls under the Thiruvananthapuram railway division of the Southern Railway zone, Indian Railways. It is the 7th most revenue generating and 6th busiest railway station in Trivandrum district. The station is situated in the Chirayinkeezhu panchayat of Trivandrum.

Details of annual passenger earnings from Chirayinkeezhu railway station

Service
Some of the major trains having halt at the station.

Passenger Trains

References 

Railway stations in Thiruvananthapuram district
Thiruvananthapuram railway division
Railway stations opened in 1904